Shewmake is a surname, either of French or Scottish origin. Notable people with the surname include:

Braden Shewmake (born 1997), American professional baseball shortstop
John Troup Shewmake (1828-1898), American lawyer and politician
Sharon Shewmake (born 1980), American politician

See also
Shoemake